Mizo Culture is the culture of the Mizo people. Mizo culture is rooted in the arts and ways of life of Mizo's in India, Bangladesh and Myanmar

Mizo People

The Mizo people (Mizo: Mizo hnam) are an ethnic group native to north-eastern India, western Burma (Myanmar) and eastern Bangladesh; this term covers several ethnic peoples who speak various Kuki-Chin languages. Though the term Mizo is often used to name an overall ethnicity, it is an umbrella term to denote the various clans, such as the Hmar, Ralte, Lai, Lusei etc. A number of dialects are still spoken under the umbrella of Mizo;

Mizoram Language

Mizo is the official language of Mizoram, along with English.  Mizo language, or Mizo ṭawng, is a language belonging to the Sino-Tibetan family of languages, spoken natively by the Mizo people in Mizoram states of India and Chin State in Burma.

Mizo Literature

Mizo literature is the literature written in Mizo ṭawng, the principal language of the Mizo peoples, which has both written and oral traditions. It has undergone a considerable change in the 20th century. The language developed mainly from the Lushai language, with significant influence from Pawi language, Paite language and Hmar language, especially at the literary level.

Mizo Music

Mizo folk music consists of vocals (singing) accompanied by traditional drums, gong and other native percussion instruments.

Mizo Folk Dance

Mizo people have a number of dances which are accompanied with few musical instrument like the gong and drum. The different dances of Mizoram are 
Cheraw dance, Khuallam, Chheihlam, Chailam, Tlanglam, Sarlamkai and Chawnglaizawn.

Mizo Festivals
Traditional festivals in Mizoram often revolved around stages of jhum cultivation or the seasons. The major kuts are Chapchar Kut, Thalfavang Kut, Mim Kut and Pawl Kut.

Mizo Cuisine

 
Mizoram shares characteristics to other regions of Northeast India and North India. The  staple food of most of the Mizo people is rice, with meat and vegetables served on the side, ranging from the homely bai, a simple vegetable stew, non veg stew with sesame, garlic, onion and herbs.

References

Indian culture by community